Trechus muscorum is a species of ground beetle in the subfamily Trechinae. It was described by P. Moravec & Wrase in 1998.

References

muscorum
Beetles described in 1998